Ulf Arne Ekstrand (born September 21, 1957 in Mölnlycke) is a former ice speed skater from Sweden, who represented his native country at the 1980 Winter Olympics in Lake Placid, United States.

References

1957 births
Living people
Swedish male speed skaters
Speed skaters at the 1980 Winter Olympics
Olympic speed skaters of Sweden
People from Härryda Municipality
Sportspeople from Västra Götaland County
20th-century Swedish people